Hronská Breznica is a village and municipality of the Zvolen District in the Banská Bystrica Region of Slovakia.

History
In historical records, the village was first mentioned in 1424 (Berzenche). It belonged, in dither order, to Dobrá Niva, György Thurzó (16th century) and Banská Bystrica’s Chamber.

External links
 
 
https://web.archive.org/web/20070513023228/http://www.statistics.sk/mosmis/eng/run.html
http://www.e-obce.sk/obec/hronskabreznica/hronska-breznica.html
http://www.oz-adela.szm.sk/Hronska_Breznica/hr_breznica.html

Villages and municipalities in Zvolen District